Algy is a masculine given name. Notable people with the name include:

Algy Clark (born 1903), American football player
Algy Gehrs (1880-1953), Australian cricketer
Algy Paterson (died 1995), last fluent speaker of the Martuthunira language
Algy Ward (21st century), English rock and roll bass guitarist and singer
Algernon "Spotty" Perkins, fictional friend of Walter the Softy from Dennis the Menace and Gnasher                              
Algernon "Algy" Lacey, fictional character in the Biggles books, friend and cousin of Biggles

See also
D'Algy

Masculine given names